Lennart Roslund (born 15 February 1946) is a Swedish sailor.  He won a silver medal in the Soling Class at the 1972 Summer Olympics.

References
 

1946 births
Living people
Sportspeople from Malmö
Swedish male sailors (sport)
Olympic sailors of Sweden
Sailors at the 1972 Summer Olympics – Soling
Olympic silver medalists for Sweden
Medalists at the 1972 Summer Olympics
European Champions Soling
Olympic medalists in sailing
20th-century Swedish people